Parajana is a genus of moths in the family Eupterotidae.

Species
 Parajana gabunica Aurivillius, 1892
 Parajana lamani Aurivillius, 1906

References

Eupterotinae